FOTN may refer to:

 Fields of the Nephilim, an English gothic rock band
 Flight of the Navigator, a 1986 American science fiction-comedy film